Þormóður Árni Egilsson (born 10 August 1969) is a retired Icelandic football defender.

References

1969 births
Living people
Thormodur Arni Egilsson
Thormodur Arni Egilsson
Thormodur Arni Egilsson
Association football defenders
Thormodur Arni Egilsson